...All That Might Have Been... is British singer-songwriter Peter Hammill's 34th solo album, released on his own Fie! Records in November 2014. Similarly to 2004's Incoherence, on the standard edition of the album there is only one epic, multi-part song. The special edition box contains two additional discs with bonus material.

Track listing
All songs written by Peter Hammill.

CD1: "Cine"
 "In Overview" (2:48)
 "The Last Time" (1:42)
 "Never Wanted" (2:16)
 "As for Him" (1:52)
 "Nowhere Special" (1:38)
 "Piper Smile" (1:13)
 "Wanted to Belong" (1:52)
 "This Might..." (1:51)
 "Inklings, Darling" (3:31)
 "Be Careful" (1:38)
 "Alien Clock" (5:52)
 "Drifting Through" (2:16)
 "Washed Up" (2:07)
 "Rumpled Sheets" (3:02)
 "Fool-Proof" (1:50)
 "Can't Get Home" (1:48)
 "Washed Away" (1:41)
 "Back Road" (2:12)
 "The Line Goes Dead" (2:01)
 "He Turns Away" (1:58)
 "Hooks" (2:14)

CD2: "Songs"
 "Upon a Sixpence" (4:58)
 "Someday (The Piper Smile)" (5:01)
 "Vai Lentissimo" (5:11)
 "Disrespect (In Kabuki-Cho)" (6:16)
 "An Outlier" (5:43)
 "The Whole Thing Through" (3:49)
 "Best Wishes" (4:15)
 "Passing Clouds" (4:37)
 "Not Going Anywhere" (4:33)
 "Until" (4:27)

CD3: "Retro"
 "SixSlowOut" (9:10)
 "KabukiCloudSome" (7:19)
 "TenorElseAny" (6:38)
 "57WishesUntil" (7:46)

Personnel
 Peter Hammill – vocals, all instruments

Technical
Peter Hammill – recording engineer, mixing (Terra Incognita, Wiltshire)
Paul Ridout – design, photography, artwork

References

Peter Hammill albums
2014 albums